is a public university in Fukuoka, Fukuoka Prefecture, Japan. Established in 1923, it was chartered as a university in 1950. Alongside Gunma Prefectural Women's University, it is one of the two public women's universities in Japan. Its abbreviated form is Fukujodai.

History 
The school was founded in 1923 as Fukuoka Prefectural Women's Vocational School. It was chartered as a university in 1950, following the Japanese school reform after World War II.

External links
 Official website

References 

Educational institutions established in 1923
Public universities in Japan
 
1923 establishments in Japan
Women's universities and colleges in Japan